W. L. Oltman was a member of the Wisconsin State Assembly.

Biography
Oltman was born on November 6, 1866. He later resided in Diamond Bluff, Wisconsin, where he became a farmer.

Political career
Oltman was a member of the Assembly during the 1905 session. Additionally, he was Chairman (similar to Mayor) of Diamond Bluff and Supervisor of Assessments of Pierce County, Wisconsin. He was a Republican.

References

People from Pierce County, Wisconsin
Republican Party members of the Wisconsin State Assembly
Mayors of places in Wisconsin
Farmers from Wisconsin
1866 births
Year of death missing